Ahuva Sherman (born 1926) is an Israeli artist who works in oil, pastel, and wall tapestries.

Biography 

She was born in Tel-Aviv, Palestine, and now lives and works in Haifa, Israel, with her studio atop Mount Carmel. Ahuva's studies were with Menachem Shemi and Prof. P. K. Hoenich at the Hammersmith School of Art in London, England, as well as in the Netherlands and the United States. Her inspiration is drawn from the land of Israel, and this can be seen and felt in her pieces. Israeli themes such as the white buildings of Jerusalem, the waves of the Mediterranean, and views of the country from above are predominant in her work. Ahuva has held numerous exhibitions and her art is present in many collections and museums both in Israel and abroad.

Selected exhibitions 
 1970 Woodstock Gallery, London, UK.
 1970 Ina Broese Gallery, Amsterdam, Netherlands.
 1971 Eik Gallery, Antwerp, DE.
 1971 Summit Gallery, London, UK.
 1972 Chagall House, Haifa, Israel.
 1973 Leigh Gallery, Manchester, UK.
 1977 National Maritime Museum.
 1978 Gallery of world Art, Boston, USA.
 1978 Temple Israel, Memphis, Tennessee, USA.
 1979 Lyon Gallery, San Francisco, California, USA.
 1981 Auditorium, Haifa, Israel.
 1984 Municipal Museum, Ramat Gan, Israel.
 1985 Artists House, Jerusalem, Israel.
 1987 Miami, Florida, USA.
 1991 Ein Hod, Artists House.
 1992 Art Expo, New York City, New York, USA.
 1994 Auditorium, Haifa, Israel.
 1998 Higashi, Kobe, Japan.
 1999 Montserrat Gallery, New York City, New York, USA.
 2001 Kastra Art center, Haifa, Israel.
 2002 Beit Gabriel- kinneret, Israel.
 2003 Mitzpe Hayamim, Israel.
 2005 Intelect - Israeli Art fest.
 2005 Hot Summer - Ein Hod.
 2005 Portrait - Beit Shagal.
 2005 Printing - Beit Shagal.
 2006 Monzon Art Gallery, Jerusalem, Israel.
 2006 Tel-Aviv University, Israel.
 2007 Nagler House, Haifa, Israel.
 2009 Horas Richter Gallery, Jaffa, Israel.
 2009 Male Or, Cezaria, Israel.
 2009 Shagal Artist House, Haifa, Israel.

Selected collections 
 The Knesset of Israel 
 Queen Beatrix of the Netherlands.
 Chaim Herzog, former President of Israel.
 Museum of Modern Art, Haifa.
 The National Maritime Museum, Haifa.
 The Bible Museum, Tel Aviv.
 Temple Israel, Memphis, Tennessee.
 President Jarbas Passarinho, Brazil.
 Louis Mermez, Parliament of France.
 Lady Edmond James de Rothschild, London.
 Mr. Jeoffrey Finsberg J.P M.P
 House of Commons, London.
 Mr. Ed Koch, former Mayor of the city of New York.
 Shaarei Zedek Synagogue, Montreal.
 Ha'apala Museum, Haifa.
 First International Bank, Israel.
 Haifa Government Complex, 10m wall Tapestry "Israel from Bird's Eye".
 Haifa Airport Reception Hall.

Awards 
 Hermann Shtruk Prize for Art.
 Special Prize at the 'Salute to Israel' Exhibition, Japan, on the 50th Anniversary of Israel.
 Haifa Municipality award for art amongst 25 distinguished women, each in her individual field, for her special achievement.

References

External links 
 

1926 births
Living people
20th-century Israeli women artists
21st-century Israeli women artists
Artists from Tel Aviv
Israeli Jews
Israeli painters
Israeli women painters
Jewish painters
Israeli portrait painters